The 2023 Supercopa de España Final was a football match that decided the winner of the 2022–23 Supercopa de España, the 39th edition of the annual Spanish football super cup competition. The match was played on 15 January 2023 at the King Fahd International Stadium in Riyadh, Saudi Arabia. The match was El Clásico between 2021–22 La Liga winners and runners-up, Real Madrid and Barcelona, the eighth time both clubs met each other in a single match to decide the winners of the Supercopa de España.

Barcelona won the match 3–1 for their 14th Supercopa de España title.

Teams

Route to the final

Match

Details

Notes

References

2023 Final
Sport in Riyadh
Supercopa de España Final
2022–23 in Spanish football
Real Madrid CF matches
FC Barcelona matches
21st century in Riyadh
El Clásico matches